"The Jacket" is the third episode of the second season of the NBC sitcom Seinfeld and the show's eighth episode overall. In the episode, Jerry Seinfeld buys an expensive suede jacket and has dinner with the father of his ex-girlfriend Elaine Benes. Elaine's father Alton, a war veteran and writer, makes Jerry and his friend George Costanza very uncomfortable. Elaine is delayed and Jerry and George are stuck with Alton waiting for her at the hotel.

The episode was written by Larry David and Jerry Seinfeld and was directed by Tom Cherones. Most of the episode's storyline was based on one of David's personal experiences. Elaine's father, a published author, was inspired by Richard Yates, author of Revolutionary Road, whom Larry David had met while dating his daughter. Lawrence Tierney's performance as Alton Benes was praised by the cast and crew. However, they were taken aback by his eccentric behavior. The majority of the episode was filmed on December 4, 1990. "The Jacket" premiered on American television on February 6, 1991, on NBC, it gained a Nielsen rating of 10.4/16 and was praised by critics.

Plot
When Jerry is shopping for clothes with Elaine, he finds a suede jacket that he loves. He has doubts about buying the jacket because it is highly expensive and has a pink and white candy-stripe lining. He ultimately decides to buy it. Kramer persuades Jerry to give him his old leather jacket as he will no longer be needing it.

The following night, Jerry, Elaine and George have dinner with Elaine's father, writer Alton Benes. While preparing for the dinner, George arrives at Jerry's apartment with the song "Master of the House" stuck in his head. Both George and Jerry are anxious about meeting Alton because they are in awe of his writings. Kramer enters the apartment and asks them to guard his illegally parked car for two minutes as he carries down some doves that he is looking after for a magician friend. However, they refuse to help because he often underestimates how long things take to do.

As they enter Alton Benes' hotel, Elaine has not arrived yet, forcing them to wait with her father for 30 minutes. Jerry and George are made increasingly uncomfortable by Alton's socially awkward and intimidating manner. When Elaine finally arrives, she explains that Kramer promised her a lift if she would wait in his car for two minutes. He returned over 20 minutes later, and the car had been towed for being illegally parked. On their way out, they notice it is snowing. Jerry knows snow would ruin his suede jacket and asks Alton if they can take a cab, but Alton replies that the restaurant is only a few blocks away. George suggests Jerry turn the jacket inside out, but because of the candy-stripe lining, Alton insists he turn it back. He also silences George when he starts singing "Master of the House".

The next day Kramer notices Jerry's jacket hanging in the bathroom, badly damaged by the snow, and asks if he can have it. Elaine tells Jerry that her father had a good time, even though he usually hates everyone. As Alton drives home, he finds himself singing "Master of the House".

Cultural references

 Throughout the episode, George sings the song "Master of the House" from the musical Les Misérables. Les Misérables ran on Broadway for sixteen years, making it one of the longest-running musicals in Broadway's history. In response to George constantly singing "Master of the House", Jerry tells him about German composer Robert Schumann, who went insane from hearing the same note over and over in his head.
 George mentions Bud Abbott, an actor and comedian during the 1940s and 1950s, who was part of the Abbott and Costello duo.
 When Jerry and George discuss their options in the hotel bathroom, George suggests that they leave, to which Jerry replies "He'll clunk our heads together like Moe." This a reference to Moe Howard, one of The Three Stooges, who frequently clunked the heads of the other Stooges together.

Production

"The Jacket" was written by Seinfeld co-creators Larry David and Jerry Seinfeld and directed by Tom Cherones. The episode's storyline was based on one of David's personal experiences; when he was dating Monica Yates, she wanted him to meet her father, Richard Yates, a respected novelist. David had just bought a suede jacket, and met Richard Yates at the Algonquin Hotel. David stated in an interview that Richard Yates was "... every bit as intimidating as Alton Benes". His story is similar to what happened in the episode, as, when they headed out to the restaurant, his jacket was ruined by the snow. Additional dialogue at the store where Jerry buys his jacket was cut before broadcast; it featured a reference to Gary Gilmore. The material was later included on the Seinfeld Volume 1 DVD set. "The Jacket" is the only episode in which one of Elaine's parents appears; Louis-Dreyfus once suggested Mary Tyler Moore to portray Elaine's mother, but the character never appeared on the show. The episode also contains the first mention to Elaine's job as a manuscript reader for Pendant Publishing; in early drafts of the script, her job was an optician. Also in early drafts, in the final scene Kramer entered Jerry's house with a dove on his shoulder.

The episode was first read by the cast on November 28, 1990 at 10:30 AM. It was filmed in front of a live audience on December 4, 1990. The episode was filmed at CBS Studio Center in Studio City, Los Angeles, California, where, starting with the season two premiere "The Ex-Girlfriend", all filming for the second season took place. The final scene in the episode, which showed Alton Benes singing "Master of the House" in his car, was pre-recorded on December 3, 1990, as it could not be filmed in front of an audience because it took place in a car.

Lawrence Tierney was cast as Alton Benes. He was known for his bad-guy roles in films during the 1940s and 1950s, such as Dillinger, The Hoodlum and Born to Kill. Tierney's appearance in the episode is one of his only comedic roles. Cast and crew members were very impressed with his performance. However, they were frightened of him; during filming it was discovered that Tierney had stolen a butcher knife from the knife block in Jerry's apartment set. Various cast members remember Seinfeld encountering Tierney and stating "Hey Lawrence, what do you got there in your jacket?" Tierney, realizing he had been caught, tried to make a joke about how he thought taking the knife would be funny, by reenacting a scene from Alfred Hitchcock's Psycho (1960), holding the knife above his head and making threatening motions towards Seinfeld. Cherones stated that, afterwards, Larry David would jokingly threaten to have Tierney back on the show if Cherones did his work badly.

Reception
On February 6, 1991, "The Jacket" was first broadcast in the United States on NBC. It gained a Nielsen rating of 10.4 and an audience share of 16, this means that 10.4% of American households watched the episode, and that 16% of all televisions in use at the time were tuned into it. It faced strong competition from the CBS crime drama Jake and the Fatman; viewers would frequently tune out of Seinfeld to watch the second half of Jake and the Fatmans. Seinfeld once jokingly stated that this was because the "Fatman" would run in the second half of the show.

The episode gained positive responses from critics. Colin Jacobson of DVD Movie Guide stated, "An otherwise mediocre episode, Lawrence Tierney's gruff turn as Elaine's father helps redeem 'The Jacket.'" DVD reviewer Jonathan Boudreaux considered "The Jacket" one of season two's best episodes, along with "The Chinese Restaurant". Critics Mary Kaye Schilling and Mike Flaherty of Entertainment Weekly graded the episode with a B−, stating, "Jerry and George's torturous hotel-lobby meeting with Mr. Benes is a squirm-inducing joy."

References

External links

 
 "The Jacket" at Sony Pictures
 "The Jacket" at Allmovie

1991 American television episodes
Seinfeld (season 2) episodes
Television episodes written by Larry David
Television episodes written by Jerry Seinfeld